William Radford (June 24, 1814 – January 18, 1870) was a United States representative from New York during the latter half of the American Civil War and the beginning of Reconstruction, serving two terms from 1863 to 1867.

Biography 
Born in Poughkeepsie, Dutchess County, he received a limited schooling, moved to New York City in 1829, and engaged in mercantile pursuits.

Congress 
He was elected as a Democrat to the Thirty-eighth and Thirty-ninth Congresses, holding office from March 4, 1863, to March 3, 1867. He was an unsuccessful candidate for reelection in 1866 to the Fortieth Congress, after which he resumed his former business pursuits.

Death 
Radford died in Yonkers, Westchester County in 1870 and was buried in the Old Presbyterian Cemetery, Westfield, Union County, New Jersey.

References

External links 

 

1814 births
1870 deaths
Politicians from Poughkeepsie, New York
People of New York (state) in the American Civil War
Democratic Party members of the United States House of Representatives from New York (state)
19th-century American politicians